The Betsy Ann was a sternwheel packet, next a towboat and finally an excursion boat. She was built by Iowa Iron Works in 1899. She is best remembered for participating in three steamboat races. She lasted 41 years, until 1940, when she was dismantled at the St. Louis Wharf. The Betsy Ann was the subject of the book The Log of the Betsy Ann, by Fred Way, former captain of the boat. She ran on the Ohio River from Pittsburgh to Portsmouth, Ohio.

Activities 
 July 24, 1928: Raced with the packet Chris Greene.
 July 16, 1929: Raced again with the packet Tom Greene.
 1930: Participated in another race, again with the Tom Greene.

References 

Steamboats of the Ohio River